Tampa is the debut novel by author Alissa Nutting, in which middle school teacher Celeste Price recounts her molestation of Jack Patrick, her fourteen-year-old student.

Plot
Celeste Price is a beautiful 26-year-old woman who is unhappily married to Ford, an alcoholic police officer with a wealthy family. She is secretly a hebephile, and has constructed her life to facilitate the pursuit of 14-year-old boys. The novel opens just before her first day as an English teacher at Jefferson Junior High, where she plans to seduce a student.

Celeste sets her sights on a shy student of hers named Jack Patrick. She repeatedly directs classroom discussion towards sexual matters, and begins to groom Jack by keeping him after class to discuss Romeo and Juliet, which the class is reading.

Celeste discovers Jack's address and drives to his house. As she hides in her car she masturbates to Jack doing mundane things in the windows. One night she watches him masturbate in his bedroom. The next day, she keeps Jack after class and claims that she accidentally saw him when she was in the area. Jack is humiliated, but Celeste tells him that she is attracted to him and the two begin a relationship. A week later, Celeste picks up Jack, who has told his father he would be working on a school project. Celeste takes Jack's virginity. When Celeste ignores Ford, distracted by fantasies about Jack, a drunk Ford criticizes Celeste for apparent disgust towards him and he violently grabs Celeste's arm.

Jack and Celeste begin meeting at his house when his father is at work. She tells him about Ford (leaving out that he is a cop), the rules of their relationship, and states that they can talk only on the burner phone Celeste gave him. Celeste is increasingly annoyed by Jack's wants for an emotional relationship. He writes her poems, asks her to say that she loves him, and insinuates the two can be publicly together when he is eighteen, a thought that revolts Celeste.

One day Jack's father Buck comes home earlier than expected. Buck is a middle-aged divorcé who immediately begins hitting on Celeste. Later, Jack suggests that she lead Buck on so she can visit more often. Celeste is able to lead on Buck, but does not have sex with him. After Buck gives her a key, Celeste visits Jack more frequently. However, her energy at home is drained from dates with Buck, and she becomes more irritated with Ford and refuses sex with him; in response, he insists on masturbating in her presence. Before Jack leaves Tampa to visit his mother over Christmas break, Jack voices that he feels threatened by Buck's interest in Celeste, which she finds humorous.

Before the start of the spring semester, Buck unexpectedly returns home early. In order to distract Buck, Celeste initiates sex with him, nearly vomiting during the encounter. Jack accidentally sees the pair having sex and runs off. Afterwards, Celeste is unable to say goodbye to him or explain what happened. Later that night, she is bombarded with calls from Jack, which she ignores.

Before class with Jack the next day, Celeste becomes increasingly paranoid. She fears that Buck was bribing Jack into manipulating her to him or that Jack killed him out of anger. Jack arrives but is angry at Celeste, believing that she wanted Buck all along. She tries to convince Jack that she is uninterested in Buck. The two embark in painful, unsatisfying anal sex. Afterward, Jack take a picture of Celeste naked, which is against her rules. She lets him keep the photo with the intention of taking his phone to delete it later.

Celeste and Jack continue to have sex, but he is still upset and is worried about being caught again by Buck, and Celeste becomes unsatisfied. She proposes they drug Buck; Jack is hesitant but eventually agrees. Celeste spikes Buck's wine with the same drugs she uses to knock herself out during sex with Ford. She and Jack drag him up to his bedroom, where they have sex in front of the unconscious Buck.

When Celeste is at Jack's house, Buck returns home unexpectedly and witnesses them having sex, then has had a heart attack. He realizes Celeste's true nature as she watches him die without helping him. In Jack's room, Celeste asks him to fondle her breasts before breaking the news to him. He runs from the room. Celeste tries and fails to find the nude photo on his phone before he returns, distraught. She performs oral sex on him then instructs him to wait before calling emergency services. She takes his burner phone and leaves the scene. When she arrives home, Ford questions where she had been. Celeste lies that she was with her coworkers.

After two weeks of truancy, Jack phones Celeste and asks her to visit him after school. She is skeptical, but goes anyway. Jack reveals that after he finishes the school year he will have to move in with his mother in Crystal Springs. Celeste coerces him into sex despite his despondency. After, Jack bleakly announces that they murdered Buck; Celeste argues with him, but knows he is right.

Over summer vacation, Celeste becomes increasingly frustrated. Jack manages to visit occasionally, but she is uninterested in his emotional troubles and plans to end the relationship. Ford's new work schedule means Celeste cannot avoid spending time with him. She fantasizes about the new students to choose from in the upcoming school year.

When school starts again, Celeste selects another boy, Boyd, as Jack's replacement. Boyd is not as shy as Jack and Celeste is concerned about his ability to be discreet, but their sexual relationship progresses rapidly. Boyd's parents are married, so they primarily meet at Buck's abandoned house for privacy. Celeste also continues her relationship with Jack, keeping both boys in the dark about each other.

One night while Celeste and Boyd are at Buck's house, Jack suddenly appears and attacks Boyd, giving him a serious head wound that gets blood on all three of them. Jack berates Celeste, having finally realized the truth about her, and then runs off. She grabs a knife and runs outside after him, naked and covered in Boyd's blood. Police arrive and take Celeste in for questioning. The nude photo on Jack's SIM card is discovered, and she is accused of molesting the boys. The interrogation is interrupted by an attorney hired by Ford's family. Celeste is told that she must apologize to Ford publicly (and is offered $15,000 if she weeps).

The case becomes a media circus, and Celeste publicly plays the role of a young, innocent woman desperate for affection. At the trial, the defense argues that Celeste is too attractive to go to prison. One night during the trial, Ford arrives drunk at Celeste's cell to confront her, trying to make sense of their relationship, but she rebuffs him and he leaves in tears, never seeing her again. Boyd and Jack are called to the stand at the trial the next day. Boyd's testimony about their relationship is over-eager, which helps make the relationship appear consensual. Jack answers questions briefly, crying, while Celeste suppresses disgust at his appearance, which has matured during his year in juvenile detention. The next day, the prosecution offers Celeste a plea bargain: she is placed on probation for four years, cannot go near a school or spend any unsupervised time with minors, and has to attend group meetings.

A year later, Celeste is given permission to move to a different town, where she gets an under-the-table job at a cabana bar under a fake name. She frequents the beach, having sex with teenage boys vacationing with their families at a nearby hotel. She thinks about Boyd and Jack, but is disgusted at the thought of them nearing adulthood. In order to stay aroused by their memory, she fantasizes that, on the night Jack discovered her with Boyd, Boyd had died from his injuries and that she finally caught up to Jack and murdered him.

Background
Tampa is the debut novel of Alissa Nutting, an essayist and creative writing professor whose first book was the 2010 short story collection Unclean Jobs for Women and Girls. Nutting was inspired by Debra Lafave, a Tampa teacher charged with having sex with one of her middle school students in 2013. Nutting went to high school with Lafave; seeing someone she knew on the news raised her awareness of the issue of female predators and changed her mind about the reality of underage male rape.

Reception
The detail of sexual content gained mixed reactions from critics. Some bookstores declined to offer the novel for sale for being too explicit in its depiction of child sexual abuse by women.

In August 2016 filmmaker Harmony Korine stated that he was working on an adaptation of the novel.

References

2013 American novels
Black comedy books
American erotic novels
Obscenity controversies in literature
Ecco Press books
2013 debut novels
Hebephilia in literature
Tragicomedy novels